St. John/Endicott High School is a US public school located in St. John, Washington. St. John/Endicott High School will compete in the 1B division in the Washington Interscholastic Athletic Association during the 2006–2007 school year. The school's mascot is the Eagle.

Location

St. John is located at  (47.090403, -117.582085).

Sports/Activities
St. John High School has a specialism in sports, including the boys' basketball team which has gone to the state championship 11 times and has been the state champions 6 times. The Football team at the high school received its first State championship trophy in the 1B Division in December, 2006.
The Eagles won 7 state championships.....1942, 1961,1963,1968,1969,1978, and 1980.

Not only do the excel in basketball, they also won the 1B baseball championship in 2011. The team rallied behind the idea of everyone getting mohawks for the championship game. The Eagles Girls Cross Country team has made it to state two consecutive times (2012-2013). The girls placed second in the 2012 Championships and third in the 2013 Championships. The Girls Cross Country team has also won the State Academic Award three years in a row (2011, 2012, 2013). The girls pulled out a very impressive GPA of 3.985.

References

External links
 St. John/Endicott High School Home Page

High schools in Whitman County, Washington
Public high schools in Washington (state)